The Seattle Seahawks are a professional American football team based in Seattle. The Seahawks compete in the National Football League (NFL) as a member club of the league's National Football Conference (NFC) West, which they rejoined in 2002 as part of a conference realignment. The club entered the NFL as an expansion team in 1976 in the NFC. From 1977 to 2001, Seattle was assigned to the American Football Conference (AFC) West. They have played their home games at Lumen Field in Seattle's SoDo neighborhood since 2002, having previously played home games in the Kingdome (1976–1999) and Husky Stadium (1994 and 2000–2001). The Seahawks are currently coached by Pete Carroll.

Seahawks fans have been referred to collectively as the "12th Man," "12th Fan," or "12s." The team's fans twice set the Guinness World Record for the loudest crowd noise at a sporting event within the span of a few months, first registering 136.6 decibels during a game against the San Francisco 49ers in September 2013, and later registering 137.6 dB during a Monday Night Football game against the New Orleans Saints that December. As the only NFL team based in the Pacific Northwest region of North America, the Seahawks attract support from the wider geographical area that includes some parts of the U.S. states of Alaska, Idaho, Montana, Oregon, and Utah, as well as the Canadian provinces of Alberta, British Columbia, and Saskatchewan.

The Seahawks have won 10 division titles and three conference championships, and are the only team to have played in both the AFC and NFC Championship Games. They have progressed to three Super Bowls, losing 21–10 to the Pittsburgh Steelers at Super Bowl XL, defeating the Denver Broncos 43–8 for their first championship at Super Bowl XLVIII, and losing 28–24 to the New England Patriots at Super Bowl XLIX. NFL players Kenny Easley, Walter Jones, Steve Hutchinson, Cortez Kennedy, and Steve Largent have been voted into the Pro Football Hall of Fame primarily or wholly for their accomplishments as Seahawks. In addition, players Dave Brown, Jacob Green, Dave Krieg, Curt Warner, Jim Zorn, and Matt Hasselbeck have been inducted into the Seahawks Ring of Honor along with head coaches Chuck Knox and Mike Holmgren, radio announcer Pete Gross, and franchise owner Paul Allen.

Franchise history

Nordstrom/Behring era (1976–1996)
As per one of the agreed parts of the 1970 AFL–NFL merger, the NFL began planning to expand from 26 to 28 teams. In June 1972, Seattle Professional Football Inc., a group of Seattle business and community leaders, announced their intention to acquire an NFL franchise for the city of Seattle. In June 1974, the NFL gave the city an expansion franchise. That December, NFL Commissioner Pete Rozelle announced the official signing of the franchise agreement by Lloyd W. Nordstrom, representing the Nordstrom family as majority partners for the consortium.

In March 1975, John Thompson, former executive director of the NFL Management Council and a former Washington Huskies executive, was hired as the general manager of the new team. The name Seattle Seahawks ("seahawk" is another name for osprey) was selected on June 17, 1975, after a public naming contest which drew more than 20,000 entries and over 1,700 names.

Thompson recruited and hired Jack Patera, a Minnesota Vikings assistant coach, to be the first head coach of the Seahawks; the hiring was announced on January 3, 1976. The expansion draft was held March 30–31, 1976, with Seattle and the Tampa Bay Buccaneers alternating picks for rounds selecting unprotected players from the other 26 teams in the league. The Seahawks were awarded the 2nd overall pick in the 1976 draft, a pick they used on defensive tackle Steve Niehaus. The team took the field for the first time on August 1, 1976, in a pre-season game against the San Francisco 49ers in the then newly opened Kingdome.

The Seahawks are the only NFL team to switch conferences twice in the post-merger era. The franchise began play in 1976 in the aforementioned NFC West but switched conferences with the Buccaneers after one season and joined the AFC West. This realignment was dictated by the league as part of the 1976 expansion plan, so that both expansion teams could play each other twice and every other NFL franchise once (the ones in their conference at the time) during their first two seasons. The Seahawks won both matchups against the Buccaneers in their first two seasons, the former of which was the Seahawks' first regular season victory.

Chuck Knox years (1983–1991) 
In 1983, the Seahawks hired Chuck Knox as head coach. Finishing with a 9–7 record, the Seahawks made their first post-season appearance, defeating the Denver Broncos in the Wild Card Round, and then the Miami Dolphins, before losing in the AFC Championship to the eventual Super Bowl champion Los Angeles Raiders. The following season, the Seahawks had their best season to that point, finishing 12–4; it would remain the best win–loss record in franchise history until their 2005 season. Knox won the NFL Coach of the Year Award.

In 1988, Ken Behring and partner Ken Hofmann purchased the team for a reported $80 million. The Seahawks won their first division title in 1988, but would miss the playoffs for the following three seasons, after which Knox left the team.

For most of the 1990s, the Seahawks continued to struggle. They saw three consecutive losing seasons (1992–1994) under head coach Tom Flores, including a franchise worst 2–14 season in 1992. Following the 1994 season, Flores was fired from the team and Dennis Erickson was brought in as head coach.

Paul Allen era (1997–present)
In 1996, Behring and Hoffman transferred the team's operations to Anaheim, California–a widely criticized move, although the team continued to play in Seattle. The team almost relocated, and was in bankruptcy for a short period. The NFL threatened Behring with fining him $500,000 a day if he did not move the team's operations back to Seattle; with this, Behring and Hoffman sold the team to Microsoft co-founder Paul Allen in 1997 for $200 million.

Erickson's tenure as head coach ended after the 1998; the Seahawks missed the playoffs for all four of his seasons with the team, extending their playoff drought to ten consecutive seasons.

Mike Holmgren years (1999–2008) 

In 1999, Mike Holmgren was hired as head coach. He would coach for 10 seasons. The Seahawks won their second division title, as well as a wild card berth in the playoffs.

In 2002, the Seahawks returned to the NFC West as part of an NFL realignment plan that gave each conference four balanced divisions of four teams each. This realignment restored the AFC West to its initial post-merger roster of original AFL teams Denver, San Diego, Kansas City, and Oakland. That same year, the team opened its new home stadium, Seahawks Stadium, after spending the last two seasons at Husky Stadium after the Kingdome's implosion in 2000.

In the 2005 season, the Seahawks had their best season in franchise history (a feat that would later be matched in 2013) with a record of 13–3, which included a 42–0 rout of the Philadelphia Eagles in a Monday Night Football game. The 13–3 record earned them the number one seed in the NFC. They won the NFC Championship Game in 2005, but lost in Super Bowl XL against the Pittsburgh Steelers. The loss was controversial; NFL Films has Super Bowl XL at number 8 on its top ten list of games with controversial referee calls. Referee Bill Leavy later admitted that he missed calls that altered the game. Before 2005, the Seahawks had not won a playoff game since the 1984 season, a streak of 21 years (five teams had ever had a drought of twenty years at the time, with their six straight losses being tied for third-most in history). That drought was ended with a 20–10 win over the Washington Redskins in the 2005 playoffs.

Holmgren departed from the team after the 2008 season, following the end of his contract. Defensive backs coach Jim L. Mora was named as Holmgren's successor. In 2009, the Seahawks finished 3rd in the NFC West with a 5–11 record. Shortly after, Mora was fired on January 8, 2010.

Pete Carroll years (2010–present) 
In the 2010 NFL season, the Seahawks made history by making it into the playoffs despite having a 7–9 record. They had the best record in a division full of teams with losing seasons (Seahawks 7–9, Rams 7–9, 49ers 6–10, Cardinals 5–11) and won the decisive season finale against the Rams (not only by overall record, but by division record, as both teams coming into the game had a 3–2 division record). In the playoffs, the Seahawks won in their first game against the defending Super Bowl XLIV champs, the New Orleans Saints, 41–36. The Seahawks made even more history during the game with Marshawn Lynch's 67-yard run, breaking 9 tackles, to clinch the victory. After the run, the fans reacted so loudly that a small earthquake (a bit above 2 on the Richter Scale) was recorded by seismic equipment around Seattle and was nicknamed the "Beast Quake." The Seahawks lost to the Bears in their second game, 35–24.

The 2012 NFL season started with doubt, as the Seahawks lost their season opener against the Arizona Cardinals, after the highly touted Seattle defense gave up a go-ahead score late in the fourth quarter, and rookie quarterback Russell Wilson failed to throw the game-winning touchdown after multiple attempts in the red-zone. However, Russell Wilson and the Seahawks went 4–1 in their next five games en route to an 11–5 overall record (their first winning record since 2007). Their 2012 campaign included big wins over the Green Bay Packers, New England Patriots, and San Francisco 49ers. The Seahawks went into the playoffs as the No. 5 seed and the only team that season to go undefeated at home. In the Wild Card Round, the Seahawks overcame a 14-point deficit to defeat the Washington Redskins. This was the first time since the 1983 Divisional Round that the Seahawks won a playoff game on the road. However, in the 2012 Divisional Round, overcoming a 20-point, fourth-quarter deficit would not be enough to defeat the #1 seed Atlanta Falcons. An ill-advised timeout and a defensive breakdown late in the game cost the Seahawks their season, as they lost, 30–28. QB Russell Wilson won the 2012 Pepsi MAX Rookie of the Year award.

Super Bowl XLVIII champions (2013) 

In the 2013 NFL season, the Seahawks continued their momentum from the previous season, finishing tied with the Denver Broncos for an NFL-best regular season record of 13–3, while earning the NFC's #1 playoff seed. Their 2013 campaign included big wins over the Carolina Panthers, New Orleans Saints, and the San Francisco 49ers. Six Seahawks players were named to the Pro Bowl: Quarterback Russell Wilson, center Max Unger, running back Marshawn Lynch, cornerback Richard Sherman, free safety Earl Thomas, and strong safety Kam Chancellor. However, none of them were able to play in the Pro Bowl, as the Seahawks defeated the New Orleans Saints 23–15 and the San Francisco 49ers 23–17, in the playoffs to advance to Super Bowl XLVIII against the Denver Broncos. On February 2, 2014, the Seahawks won the franchise's only Super Bowl Championship, defeating Denver 43–8. The Seahawks' defense performance in 2013 was acclaimed as one of the best in the Super Bowl era.

The 2014 campaign saw the team lose some key pieces, including wide receiver Golden Tate to free agency and wide receiver Sidney Rice and defensive end Chris Clemons to retirement. Percy Harvin was also let go mid-season after several underachieving weeks and clashes with the rest of the locker room. Despite starting 3–3, they rallied to a 12–4 record, good enough once again for the #1 seed in the NFC Playoffs. After dispatching the Carolina Panthers handily in the Divisional Round 31–17, they faced the Green Bay Packers in the NFC Championship Game. Despite five turnovers and trailing 19–7 late in the contest, the Seahawks prevailed in overtime to reach Super Bowl XLIX against New England Patriots, but an ill-fated interception at the 1-yard line late in the championship game stymied a comeback attempt and thwarted the Seahawks' bid to be the first repeat Super Bowl champions since the Patriots had won Super Bowls XXXVIII and XXXIX.

The Seahawks returned to the playoffs in both 2015 and 2016, but despite winning the Wild Card game in both years they failed to win either Divisional round game on the road. The 2017 iteration of the team missed the playoffs for the first time in six years, as injuries to their core players coupled with disappointing acquisitions of running back Eddie Lacy and kicker Blair Walsh failed them in a competitive NFC. The team cut ties with most of the remaining players that had been part of their meteoric rise and turnover both their Offensive and Defensive coaching staff in 2018, and an influx of young talent helped propel the team to a 10–6 record and another playoff berth that ultimately ended in a loss in the Wild Card game. In October 2018, owner Paul Allen died after a prolonged fight with cancer. In 2019, the Seahawks put up their best record since their last trip to the Super Bowl at 11–5, but they still lost 3 out of their last 4 games and lost their chance to win the NFC West. A likely explanation for their sloppy finish is because many of their players were injured late in the season. After defeating the Philadelphia Eagles 17–9 in the Wild Card game, they lost to the Green Bay Packers in the Divisional round, failing another attempt at a second Super Bowl.

The 2020 season saw the Seahawks win their first five games, a franchise-best for a start to a season. Despite the Seahawks losing three of their next four games, the Seahawks finished strong, earning twelve victories for the first time since their Super Bowl season in 2014, and winning the division for the first time in four years. However, despite the 12–4 record and the division title, the Seahawks' season ended the following week against the Rams, who never trailed in a 30–20 victory. The Seahawks struggled and started the 2021 season 3–8. Russell Wilson had an injured finger missing 3 games and the Seahawks were shut out the first time in the Wilson era in Week 10 against the Packers. This was their worst first half of a season since 2009, under then-head coach Jim Mora. The Seahawks were eliminated from playoff contention on December 26 in a loss to the Chicago Bears, and they finished last in their division for the first time since 1996. With wins over the Lions and the Cardinals they finished 7–10.

Following the 2021 season was an off-season of continuing change, punctuated with the trade of quarterback Russell Wilson to the team he and the Seahawks beat in Super Bowl XLVIII, the Denver Broncos, on March 6, 2022. The Broncos traded quarterback Drew Lock, tight end Noah Fant, defensive lineman Shelby Harris, two first-round picks (for that year's draft, No. 9 overall, and 2023's), two second-round picks (that year's, No. 40 overall, and 2023's) and a 2022 fifth-round selection to the Seahawks for Wilson and a 2022 fourth-round pick. Another hallmark franchise player from the Super Bowl-winning Seahawks, former All-Pro linebacker Bobby Wagner, was also cut by the team that same day, a move that saves them $16.6 million in cap space. The Seahawks also took on $26 million in dead money by trading Wilson; ESPN Stats & Information research revealed it to be the second-most dead money a team has ever incurred, trailing the $33.8 million the Philadelphia Eagles ate in their trade of Carson Wentz the previous year.

Logos and uniforms

The helmet and pants were silver while the home jerseys were royal blue with white and green sleeve stripes and white numerals and names. The road jersey was white, with white, blue and green sleeve stripes and had blue numerals and names. The socks were blue and had the same green and white striping pattern seen on the blue jerseys. Black shoes were worn for the first four seasons, one of the few NFL teams that did so in the late 1970s, at a time when most teams were wearing white shoes. They would switch to white shoes in 1980.

In , coinciding with the arrival of Chuck Knox as head coach, the uniforms were updated slightly. The striping on the arms now incorporated the Seahawks logo, and the TV numbers, previously located on the sleeves, moved onto the shoulders. The helmet facemasks changed from gray to blue. Also, the socks went solid blue at the top, and white on bottom. In the 1985 season, the team wore 10th Anniversary patches on the right side of their pants. It had the Seahawks logo streaking through the number 10. In 1994, the year of the NFL's 75th Anniversary, the Seahawks changed the style of their numbering to something more suitable for the team; Pro Block from then until 2001. That same year, the Seahawks wore a vintage jersey for select games resembling the 1976–82 uniforms. However, the helmet facemasks remained blue. The logos also became sewn on instead of being screen-printed. In 2000, Shaun Alexander's rookie year and Cortez Kennedy's last, the Seattle Seahawks celebrated their 25th Anniversary; the logo was worn on the upper left chest of the jersey. In 2001, the Seahawks switched to the new Reebok uniform system still in their then-current uniforms after that company signed a 10-year deal to be the exclusive uniform supplier to the NFL, but it would be their last in this uniform after the season ended. Prior to this, various companies made the team's uniforms.

On March 1, to coincide with the team moving to the NFC as well as the opening of Seahawks Stadium (later renamed Qwest, CenturyLink, and currently Lumen Field), both the logo and the uniforms were heavily redesigned. The Wordmark was designed by Mark Verlander and the logo was designed by NFL Properties in-house design team. The colors were modified to a lighter "Seahawks Blue," a darker "Seahawks Navy" and lime green piping. The helmets also were changed from silver to the lighter "Seahawks Blue" color after a fan poll was conducted. Silver would not be seen again until 2012. The logo artwork was also subtly altered, with an arched eyebrow and a forward-facing pupil suggesting a more aggressive-looking bird. At first, the team had planned to wear silver helmets at home and blue helmets on the road, but since NFL rules forbid the use of multiple helmets, the team held the fan poll to decide which color helmet would be worn. The team had usually worn all blue at home and all white on the road since 2003, but late in the 2009 season, the Seahawks wore the white jersey-blue pants combo. The blue jersey and white pants combo has been worn for only one regular-season game, the 2005 season opener at the Jacksonville Jaguars, while the white jersey and blue pants combination has not been worn regularly since late in the 2002 season, with the exception of late in the 2009 season. In 2009, the Seahawks once again wore the white jersey and blue pants combination for road games against Minnesota (November 22), St. Louis (November 29), Houston (December 13), and Green Bay (December 27).

The Seahawks wore their home blue jerseys during Super Bowl XL despite being designated as the visitor, since the Pittsburgh Steelers, the designated home team, elected to wear their white jerseys.

Since the Oakland Raiders wore their white jerseys at home for the first time ever in a game against the San Diego Chargers on September 28, 2008, the Seahawks are the only NFL team never to have worn their white jerseys at home.

On September 27, 2009, the Seahawks wore lime green jerseys for the first time, paired with new dark navy blue pants in a game against the Chicago Bears. The jerseys matched their new sister team, the expansion Seattle Sounders FC of Major League Soccer who wear green jerseys with blue pants. On December 6, 2009, the Seahawks wore their Seahawks blue jersey with the new dark navy blue pants for the first time, in a game against the San Francisco 49ers. The Seahawks broke out the same combo two weeks later against the Tampa Bay Buccaneers, and two weeks after that in the 2009 regular-season finale against the Tennessee Titans. In December 2009, then-coach Jim Mora announced that the new lime green jerseys were being retired because the team did not win in them, because he liked the standard blue home jerseys better, and added that the home jersey is a better match for the navy pants. In the same press conference, he stated that the new navy pants "felt better" on players as opposed to the Seahawks blue pants. For the 2010 season, Seattle returned to the traditional all "Seahawks Blue" at home and all white on the road.

On April 3, 2012, Nike, which took over as the official uniform supplier for the league from Reebok, unveiled new uniform and logo designs for the Seahawks for the 2012 season. The new designs incorporate a new accent color, "Wolf Grey," and the main colors are "College Navy" and "Action Green." The uniforms incorporate "feather trims," multiple feathers on the crown of the helmet, twelve feathers printed on the neckline and down each pant leg to represent the "12th Man," referring to the team's fans. The Seahawks have three different jersey colors: navy blue, white, and an alternate grey jersey. The Seahawks will have three different pants: navy blue with green feathers, gray with navy blue feathers, and white with navy blue feathers. Their new logo replaces the Seahawk blue with wolf grey. Altogether, there are nine different uniform combinations possible.

The Seahawks wore their Nike home blue jerseys for the first regular-season game on September 16, 2012, against the Dallas Cowboys. The uniform Marshawn Lynch wore in that game is preserved at the Pro Football Hall of Fame. On September 9, 2012, the Seahawks wore their Nike white away jerseys for the first regular-season game against the Arizona Cardinals; on October 14, 2012, with the Carolina Panthers wearing white at home, they wore their blue jerseys with gray pants (and would do so again against the Miami Dolphins seven weeks later); and on December 16, 2012, they wore their Alternate Wolf Grey jerseys for the first time against the Buffalo Bills.

The all-navy ensemble is the Seahawks' current primary uniform option for home games. Initially, the Seahawks paired their navy uniforms with gray pants on select road games in which the home team wore white jerseys, but on December 5, 2021, the Seahawks wore this combination at home for the first time in a game against the San Francisco 49ers. On the road, the Seahawks primarily pair their white uniforms with the navy pants (that combination was used during their Super Bowl XLVIII win), although they also pair the white uniforms with either white or gray pants on occasion. The all-gray uniforms are worn occasionally on the road, mainly against the Arizona Cardinals.

In 2016, the Seahawks unveiled their NFL Color Rush uniform, an all-Action Green ensemble. They first wore the uniform on December 16 against the Los Angeles Rams at home, marking the first time they wore green uniforms since 2009. The Seahawks continue to wear the Color Rush set as an alternate uniform alongside the all-gray combination.

During a home matchup with the Vikings on December 3, 2019, the Seahawks wore their Color Rush green tops and regular navy pants. The combination was used again on October 11, 2020, also against the Vikings, and then again on November 19, against the Arizona Cardinals. It was used once in 2021, on Thursday Night Football vs. the Rams.

In the 2020 home game vs. Arizona, the Cardinals wore their all-black color rush uniform, marking the only time a visiting team has worn a dark jersey in Seattle.

Rivalries

San Francisco 49ers

From 2011 to 2014, the Seahawks and the San Francisco 49ers emerged as two of the best teams in the NFC, and naturally developed a heated rivalry as a result. The 49ers head coach at the time, Jim Harbaugh, had a contentious history with Seahawks coach Pete Carroll due to Harbaugh's previous job as coach at Stanford against Carroll's USC Trojans. While the 49ers had the upper hand in the early stages of the rivalry, winning the first three head-to-head contests against Carroll in 2011 and Week 7 of 2012, the tide began to turn when the Seahawks defeated the 49ers soundly in Week 16 of 2012 on prime time by a score of 42–13. Both teams reached the playoffs that year, and the 49ers reached Super Bowl XLVII only to lose to the Baltimore Ravens. In 2013, the Seahawks again thumped the 49ers 29–3 in a Week 2 contest, but the 49ers would triumph in Week 14 by a score of 19–17. The Seahawks would ultimately have the last laugh, however, when they beat the 49ers in the 2013 NFC Championship Game 23–17. The game was back and forth until the final moments, when a pass intended for 49ers WR Michael Crabtree was tipped by Richard Sherman and ultimately intercepted by LB Malcolm Smith in the end zone, with 25 seconds left in the 4th quarter to end  the game. The Seahawks won both games against the 49ers in 2014, notably trouncing them 19–3 on a Thanksgiving night game at Levi's Stadium in Santa Clara. Harbaugh was fired at the end of the season, effectively rendering the rivalry dormant.

Since rejoining the NFC West, the Seahawks lead the series 25–13 versus the 49ers, including playoffs. Overall, the Seahawks lead the series 27–17.

Los Angeles Rams

The rivalry between the Seahawks and Los Angeles Rams came into existence in 2002 following the Seahawks’ relocation to the NFC West. The first notable matchup between the two clubs occurred in the 2004 NFC Wild card round when the Rams managed to defeat the Seahawks in Seattle 27–20 and currently hold the streak for the only two wins against the Seahawks at home during the postseason. Much of the intensity waned as the Rams declined in competition throughout the 2000s and early 2010s, but several notable matchups between the two clubs would still occur. Most recently, the rivalry has grown exponentially in animosity between the two clubs with notable moments of taunting or violence occurring. Following the Rams' return to Los Angeles in 2016, and subsequent playoff success (most recently with A Super Bowl victory in 2022); the Rivalry has increased in intensity; especially as Seattle's Legion Of Boom era teams waned in competition.
Tensions especially ran high during the 2021 Wild Card game following a widely publicized taunt from Safety Jamal Adams during a postgame conference after a tough win over the Rams during week 16. The Rams would go onto decimate the Seahawks in the wild card game, with cornerback Jalen Ramsey and quarterback Jared Goff expressing their satisfaction to get retribution following Adams' comments and cigar gesture.

The Seahawks lead the series 25–24, but the Rams have won both playoff meetings.

Arizona Cardinals 

The Cardinals and Seahawks became divisional rivals after both were relocated to the NFC West as a result of the league's realignment in 2002. This rivalry has become one of the NFL's more bitter in recent years, as the mid-to-late 2010s often saw the Seahawks and Cardinals squaring off for NFC West supremacy. Many Cardinals fans see the Seahawks as their top rival due to their 2010s dominance under quarterback Russell Wilson and head coach Pete Carroll, although Seattle shares more intense rivalries with the Rams and 49ers. Seattle leads the series 23–22–1, and the two teams have yet to meet in the playoffs.

Green Bay Packers

Since moving to the NFC, the Seahawks have faced the Green Bay Packers several times in the playoffs, developing an intense rivalry as well.

Denver Broncos

From the 1980s to the 2002 league realignment, the Denver Broncos were a major rival for the Seahawks. With John Elway, the Broncos were one of the best teams in the NFL, going 200–124–1 overall, and were 32–18 against the Seahawks. Since 2002, Denver has won three of five interconference meetings, and the teams met in Super Bowl XLVIII on February 2, 2014, where the Seahawks won 43–8. On March 8, 2022 the Seattle Seahawks agreed to trade Russell Wilson and a 2022 fourth-round pick to the Denver Broncos for quarterback Drew Lock, tight end Noah Fant, defensive lineman Shelby Harris, two first-round picks (2022 -- No. 9 overall -- and 2023), two second-round picks (2022 -- No. 40 overall -- and 2023) and a 2022 fifth-round selection. Russell Wilson's first game against the Seattle Seahawks as a member of the Denver Broncos was played September 12, 2022 on Monday Night Football, where the Seahawks won 17-16.

Headquarters and training camps
During the Seahawks' first ten seasons (1976–85), the team's headquarters was in Kirkland at the southern end of the Lake Washington Shipyard (now Carillon Point), on the shores of Lake Washington. The summer training camps were held across the state at Eastern Washington University in Cheney, southwest of Spokane.

When the team's new headquarters across town in Kirkland was completed in 1986, the Seahawks held training camp at home for the next eleven seasons (1986–96), staying in the dormitories of the adjacent Northwest College. In 1997, Dennis Erickson's third season as head coach, the team returned to the hotter and more isolated Cheney for training camp, which continued through 2006. In 2007, training camp returned to the Seahawk's Kirkland facility because of the scheduled China Bowl (NFL) game, which was later canceled. In 2008, the Seahawks held the first three weeks of camp in Kirkland, then moved to the new  Virginia Mason Athletic Center (VMAC) on August 18 for the final week of training camp, where the team has held their training camps since. The new facility, adjacent to Lake Washington in Renton, has four full-size practice fields: three natural grass outdoors and one FieldTurf indoors.

Seasons and overall records

As of the end of the 2020 season, the Seattle Seahawks have competed in 45 NFL seasons, dating back to their expansion year of 1976. Seattle has reached the playoffs in 19 separate seasons, including in the 2005 season when they lost Super Bowl XL to the Pittsburgh Steelers, the 2013 season when they defeated the Denver Broncos to win Super Bowl XLVIII, and the 2014 season when they lost Super Bowl XLIX to the New England Patriots. In the 2010 season, the Seahawks became the first team in NFL history to earn a spot in the playoffs with a losing record (7–9, .438) in a full season; this was by virtue of winning the division. The Seahawks would go on to defeat the reigning Super Bowl champion New Orleans Saints in the Wild Card round, becoming the first team ever to win a playoff game with a losing record. Until Week 7 of the 2016 season against the Arizona Cardinals, the Seahawks had never recorded a tied game in their history.

Players

Current roster

35th Anniversary Team (2010)
The 35th Anniversary team was voted upon by users on Seahawks.com and announced in 2010. Bold indicates those elected to the Pro Football Hall of Fame.

Retired numbers

 † Jerry Rice wore No. 80 for his 2004 stint with the Seahawks. According to Rice, the team offered him the jersey number, with Largent's permission.
 Several other players and individuals related to the team have been honored by their induction into the Seattle Seahawks Ring of Honor

Pro Football Hall of Famers

Note: Although Mike McCormack served as head coach, president, and general manager for the Seahawks, he is only listed in the Pro Football Hall of Fame for his contributions as a tackle for the New York Yanks and the Cleveland Browns.

State of Washington Sports Hall of Fame

Ownership and personnel

Team owners
 The Nordstrom family: 1976–1988
 Ken Behring & Ken Hofmann: 1988–1996
 Paul Allen: 1997–2018
 Paul G. Allen Trust: October, 2018 to present

Current staff

Previous head coaches

Team culture

12th Man

The 12th man (also known as the 12s) refers to the fan support of the Seahawks. The team's first home stadium, the Kingdome, was one of the loudest and most disruptive environments in the NFL. Opponents were known to practice with rock music blaring at full blast to prepare for the often painfully high decibel levels generated at games in the Kingdome.

In 2002, the Seahawks began playing at what is now Lumen Field. Every regular season and playoff game at Lumen Field since the 2nd week of the 2003 season has been played before a sellout crowd. Like the Kingdome before it, Lumen Field is one of the loudest stadiums in the league. The stadium's partial roof and seating decks trap and amplify the noise and reflect it back down to the field. This noise has caused problems for opposing teams, causing them to commit numerous false-start penalties. From 2002 through 2012, there have been 143 false-start penalties on visiting teams in Seattle, second only to the Minnesota Vikings.

The Seahawks' fans have twice set the Guinness World Record for the loudest crowd noise at a sporting event, first on September 15, 2013, registering 136.6 dB during a game against the San Francisco 49ers and again on December 2, 2013, during a Monday Night Football game against the New Orleans Saints, with a roar of 137.6 dB. As of September 29, 2014, the record of 142.2 dB is held in Arrowhead Stadium by fans of the Kansas City Chiefs.

Prior to kickoff of each home game, the Seahawks salute their fans by raising a giant #12 flag at the south end of the stadium. Current and former players, coaches, local celebrities, prominent fans including Patti Hammond, Seattle-area athletes, and former owner Paul Allen have raised the flag. Earlier, the Seahawks retired the #12 jersey on December 15, 1984, as a tribute to their fans. Before their Super Bowl win, the Seahawks ran onto the field under a giant 12th Man flag.

In September 1990, Texas A&M University filed, and was later granted, a trademark application for the "12th Man" term, based on their continual usage of the term since the 1920s. In January 2006, Texas A&M filed suit against the Seattle Seahawks to protect the trademark and in May 2006, the dispute was settled out of court. In the agreement, which expired in 2016, Texas A&M licensed the Seahawks to continue using the phrase, in exchange for a licensing fee, public acknowledgement of A&M's trademark when using the term, a restriction in usage of the term to seven states in the Northwest United States, and a prohibition from selling any "12th Man" merchandise. Once the agreement expired, the Seahawks were allowed to continue using the number "12" but were no longer permitted to use the "12th Man" phrase. In August 2015, the Seahawks decided to drop their signage of the "12th Man" term and shifted towards referring to their fans as the "12s" instead.

Mascots
Starting in the 1998 season, Blitz has been the Seahawks' official mascot. Prior to the 2014 NFL season, Blitz was given a new look and a sidekick; a secondary mascot named Boom was introduced to appeal to and interact with younger children.

In the 2003 and 2004 seasons, a hawk named Faith would fly around the stadium just before the team came out of the tunnel. However, because of her relatively small size and an inability to be trained to lead the team out of the tunnel, Faith was replaced by an augur hawk named Taima before the start of the 2005 NFL season. Taima started leading the team out of the tunnel in September 2006.

Cheerleaders
A group of female and male cheerleaders known as the Seahawks Dancers rallies the crowd from the sidelines and performs a halftime routine during home games at Lumen Field. The group was an all-female squad called the Sea Gals prior to admitting male members and re-branding ahead of the 2019 NFL season. During the off-season, a select performing group from the Dancers travels to parades and other events, as well as with other NFL Cheerleaders on the road.

Band
Beginning in 2004, the Seahawks introduced their drum line, the Blue Thunder. The group plays at every home game as well as over 100 events in the Seattle community.

Franchise records and achievements

Super Bowl appearances

Individual awards

NFL Most Valuable Player
 Shaun Alexander – 2005

Super Bowl MVP
 Malcolm Smith – XLVIII (2013)

NFL Offensive Player of the Year
 Shaun Alexander – 2005

NFL Defensive Player of the Year
 Kenny Easley – 1984
 Cortez Kennedy – 1992

Walter Payton NFL Man of the Year Award
 Steve Largent – 1988
 Russell Wilson – 2020

Pepsi NFL Rookie of the Year
 Russell Wilson – 2012

NFL Coach of the Year
 Jack Patera – 1978
 Chuck Knox – 1984

First-team All-Pro
 Kenny Easley – 1983, 1984, 1985
 Norm Johnson – 1984
 Steve Largent – 1985
 Bobby Joe Edmonds – 1986
 Fredd Young – 1987
 Cortez Kennedy – 1992, 1993, 1994
 Chad Brown – 1998
 Walter Jones – 2001, 2004, 2005, 2007
 Steve Hutchinson – 2003, 2005
 Shaun Alexander – 2005
 Mack Strong – 2005
 Patrick Kerney – 2007
 Lofa Tatupu – 2007
 Marshawn Lynch – 2012
 Richard Sherman – 2012, 2013, 2014
 Earl Thomas – 2012, 2013, 2014
 Max Unger – 2012
 Bobby Wagner – 2014, 2016, 2017, 2018, 2019, 2020
 Tyler Lockett – 2015
 Michael Dickson – 2018

NFL All-Decade Team
 Steve Largent – 1980s (1980–1989)
 Kenny Easley – 1980s (1981–1997)
 Cortez Kennedy – 1990s (1990–1999)
 Michael Bates – 1990s (1993–1995)
 Steve Hutchinson – 2000s (2001–2005)
 Edgerrin James – 2000s (2009)
 Walter Jones – 2000s (2000–2009)
 Shaun Alexander – 2000s (2000–2007)
 Marshawn Lynch – 2010s (2010–2015, 2019)
 Richard Sherman – 2010s (2011–2017)
 Earl Thomas – 2010s (2010–2018)
 Bobby Wagner – 2010s (2012–2019)

NFL 100th Anniversary All-Time Team
 Devin Hester – 2016
 Walter Jones – 1997–2009
 Steve Largent – 1976–1989
 John Randle – 2000–2003
 Jerry Rice – 2004

Radio and television

The Seahawks' flagship station is KIRO  – KIRO-FM . Games are heard on 47 stations in five western states and Canada. Microsoft holds naming rights for the broadcasts for their web search engine under the moniker of the "Bing Radio Network." The current announcers are former Seahawks players Steve Raible (who was the team's color commentator from ) and Dave Wyman. The Raible-Wyman regular season pairing has been together since the final four games of 2017 but became full time starting in 2018. On local television broadcast preseason games are split between former Seahawks Paul Moyer, Sam Adkins, and Brock Huard).

Preseason games not shown on national networks were produced in-house by Seahawks Broadcasting and televised by KING-TV, channel 5 (and, in 2008, also on sister station KONG-TV since KING, an NBC affiliate, was committed to the Summer Olympics in China). Curt Menefee (the host of Fox NFL Sunday) has been the Seahawks TV voice since the 2009 preseason. KCPQ-TV, which airs most of the Seahawks' regular-season games (as the Seattle-Tacoma area's Fox affiliate), became the television partner for the team in 2012 and replaced KING-TV as broadcaster for preseason games, but KING-TV regained the partnership in 2022; simulcasts of any Seahawks games on ESPN's Monday Night Football air (as of the 2018 season) on CBS affiliate KIRO-TV. In addition, any Saturday or Sunday afternoon games broadcast by CBS (usually—but not always—with the Seahawks hosting an AFC opponent) will air on KIRO-TV.

Radio affiliates

Washington

Alaska

Idaho

Montana

Oregon

British Columbia

Notes and references
Explanatory notes

Citations

External links

 
 Seattle Seahawks at the National Football League official website

 
National Football League teams
Companies based in Renton, Washington
American football teams established in 1976
American football teams in Washington (state)